The 1928–29 Duke Blue Devils men's basketball team represented Duke University during the 1928–29 men's college basketball season. The head coach was Eddie Cameron, coaching his first season with the Blue Devils. The team finished with an overall record of 12–8.

References 

Duke Blue Devils men's basketball seasons
Duke
1928 in sports in North Carolina
1929 in sports in North Carolina